Siate Tokolahi (born 16 March 1992) is a Tongan rugby union player who currently plays as a prop for  in New Zealand's domestic Mitre 10 Cup and the  in the international Super Rugby competition.

Early career

Born in Tonga, Tokolahi showed promise to become a top rugby player from an early age and was brought to New Zealand on a Sean Fitzpatrick scholarship to attend Sacred Heart College in Auckland.   However, in 2009 aged 17 Tokolahi switched to St. Bede's College in Christchurch which made him eligible to play for Canterbury's youth sides.   The move sparked controversy at the time and saw allegations of poaching leveled at the Canterbury Rugby Union.   After graduating high-school, Tokolahi played for Canterbury's academy in 2012 and the Crusaders Knights development squad in 2013 while playing local club rugby for Belfast.

Senior career

Tokolahi first made the Canterbury squad aged 22 in 2014, debuting in a 48-9 victory over perennial rivals  in week 1 of the season.

2015 saw Canterbury back to winning ways, lifting the ITM Cup Premiership title after a 25-23 defeat of Auckland in Christchurch. Tokokahi was a key squad member, playing in 11 of the Cantabrians 12 games through the year with the majority of these appearances coming from the replacements bench as a result of stiff competition from the province's other front row forwards; Joe Moody, Nepo Laulala, Daniel Lienert-Brown and Alex Hodgman.

Super Rugby

After just one season and seven games for Canterbury at domestic level, Tokolahi was named in the Hamilton-based  Super Rugby squad ahead of the 2015 season. Throughout 2015 Tokolahi largely played the role of second-half replacement, starting only 5 of 17 games and this was a trend that continued through 2016.

Searching for a more regular starting role at Super Rugby level, Tokolahi switched franchises ahead of the 2017 Super Rugby season, leaving the Chiefs in favour of the Dunedin-based , tournament winners in 2015, who were seeking front-row replacements for the departed Josh Hohneck and the injured Brendon Edmonds.

Career Honours

Canterbury

National Provincial Championship - 2015, 2016

Super Rugby Statistics

References

1992 births
Tongan rugby union players
Canterbury rugby union players
Chiefs (rugby union) players
Rugby union props
Tongan emigrants to New Zealand
People educated at Sacred Heart College, Auckland
People educated at St Bede's College, Christchurch
Living people
Highlanders (rugby union) players
Southland rugby union players
Section Paloise players